The Medieval Chronicle Society is an international and interdisciplinary organization founded to facilitate the work of scholars interested in medieval annals and chronicles, or more generally medieval historiography. It was founded in 1999 and in February 2011 had 380 members.

Aims and history
Annals and chronicles were the main genres of historical writing in the Middle Ages. Consequently, they have always been of great importance to historians.  The extent to which they are also of interest to students of medieval literature or of historical linguistics was only fully realised in the latter part of the 20th century.  Since many chronicles are illustrated, they are also a fruitful object of study for art historians.  It was the desire for a forum in which these disciplines could operate together that led to the foundation of the society.

The history of the society began with a series of triennial conferences initially in Utrecht, but later moving from place to place.  These early conferences were hosted by Erik Kooper (English studies, Utrecht).  It was at the second of these conferences, in 1999, that the society was formally founded.

The society maintains a website financed by the University of Liverpool, and publishes a regular newsletter with information on recent publications in the chronicles field.

The Society’s logo, depicting two interlocked dragons, was inspired by a unique series of fifteenth-century Utrecht manuscripts, all containing one or two dragons as part of their historiated initials. These two particular dragons were adopted for the logo because they aptly represented the twin disciplines of history and literature, and the city where the Society was established in 1999.

Journal The Medieval Chronicle

Volumes of proceedings of the first three conferences were published by Rodopi.  When the society was founded, this triennial publication was transformed into a yearbook, now the peer-reviewed journal The Medieval Chronicle. It is edited by Erik Kooper and (since volume 8) Sjoerd Levelt.

The journal is trilingual, with articles in English, French and German. As well as the proceedings of the society's conferences, and also of the Cambridge Chronicle Symposium, the journal includes research submitted independently of the conferences. A number of text editions of chronicles have also been published here.

Conferences
Conferences to date:
1996 Utrecht (Driebergen)
1999 Utrecht (Driebergen) 
2002 Utrecht (Doorn)
2005 Reading
2008 Belfast
2011 Pécs
2014 Liverpool
2017 Lisbon
2021 Poznań
2023 Nancy (in planning)

Projects
A number of interdisciplinary projects have been inspired by the society, including Repertorium Chronicarum an on-line database of Latin chronicle manuscripts maintained by Dan Embree on the website of Mississippi State university.

A major project of the society was the Encyclopedia of the Medieval Chronicle published in Leiden by Brill, edited by Graeme Dunphy.
The EMC contains around 2500 usually quite short articles on individual authors or on anonymous works. A majority of these are from Western Christendom, but there are also entries on Slavic, Byzantine, Syriac, Islamic and Jewish chronicles. These give information on the date, language, form and manuscript tradition, and discuss issues which have been highlighted in recent scholarship. There are also about 60 longer "thematic" articles on particular aspects of chronicles. The two-volume paper edition appeared in 2010 and runs to around 1830 pages, with about 60 black-and-white full-page illustrations. About 450 scholars collaborated in writing it. An electronic edition with additional articles appeared in 2012, co-edited by Cristian Bratu; updates with significant expansions appeared in 2016 and 2021.

See also
List of historical societies
List of literary societies
Rolls Series
Text publication society
List of sources for the Crusades

References

External links
 Website of the Medieval Chronicle Society
 Encyclopedia of the Medieval Chronicle – catalogue entry at Brill Publishers for the print version.
 Encyclopedia of the Medieval Chronicle – online access to the electronic version.

Chronicles
Medieval literature
History organizations
International organizations based in Europe
Organizations established in 1999
21st-century encyclopedias